Pat Kirtley (born in Kentucky, United States) is an American fingerstyle guitarist, composer and guitar educator.

Biography 

Pat Kirtley grew up in a musical Kentucky family. As a child he was exposed to the musical influences of his mother's family – listening to country and bluegrass – and his father's family who were more attracted to pop and classical music.

Kirtley's first exposure to guitar, at age 5, was hearing guitarist and composer Spider Rich (writer of many tunes for Chet Atkins, including Yakety Axe) in a small recording studio where Kirtley's father worked as a part-time assistant. Rich was playing fingerstyle in the style of Chet Atkins, and Kirtley says from that moment, he wanted to learn guitar. He began learning at age 8, taught by two uncles who were influenced by Chet Atkins and Merle Travis, as well as pop and country music of the day.

In his teenage years he was also drawn to recording and its technology. By age 13, he had acquired a tape recorder and had become interested in electronics, not just using the equipment, but teaching himself how to build and modify it. He soon began experimenting with tone modification and looping techniques on his recorder and took his early steps in recording with some of his first, never to be published compositions as a 14-year-old.[,

In the early seventies, after having played in groups including pop, rock, jazz, and a nine-piece R&B show band, Kirtley moved away from electric guitar and began focusing on the acoustic, playing both steel-string and nylon-string guitars. During this time he began to develop his unique playing style, using alternate tunings, and writing original material. In 1974-75 Kirtley recorded his first album, with eastern Kentucky guitarist Wendell Cornett. Though the album was never released, it established the characteristics of Kirtley's acoustic style, introducing tunes like "B-Rod's Rag" and "Old Joe Clark" which were re-recorded 20 years later for his first CD Kentucky Guitar.

While always an ardent guitar player, Kirtley began his professional career on the other side of the microphone, working as a studio engineer and producer for twelve years beginning in the mid-70's. He continued playing and creating his compositions, but never published them or pursued working professionally as a guitarist until around 1989, when he began touring as a solo act. In 1992 he entered the fingerstyle competition at the Walnut Valley Festival in Winfield, Kansas - without notable success. He didn't give up, and won the 1994 National Thumbpicking Contest in Mountain View, Arkansas. That same year, he released his first CD Kentucky Guitar, which earned very positive reviews. The next year, 1995, he went to Winfield for the third time and became the National Fingerstyle Guitar Champion in the Walnut Valley Festival competition.

In 1996, Kirtley was chosen to participate in a project for Narada Records, a CD titled Guitar Fingerstyle, featuring a collection of tracks from leading contemporary acoustic guitar artists. The release was a  success for the label, selling nearly a quarter-million copies worldwide. 1997 and 1998 saw Kirtley releasing two more CDs, Irish Guitar and Rural Life. Both contain his own solo guitar compositions, and arrangements of pop and traditional tunes. He then appeared on other artist's CDs as accompanying guitarist and also began developing pieces for a group/duo context, leading up to his CD "Just Listen" (2000), which featured collaborations with Tommy Emmanuel, jazz guitarist Craig Wagner, and acoustic super-group Nickel Creek. The group sound context was further developed on Kirtley's Brazilian Guitar, released in 2002. This CD focuses on Brazilian Samba and Bossa Nova styles and was recorded with an ensemble setting. Here Kirtley's sound comes from the nylon-string guitar instead of his usual steel-string.

Through this period, Kirtley also released a number of video projects, including three instructional titles for Stefan Grossman's Guitar Workshop, as well as producing a number of videos on other artists. In 1999 he released the video Nine Pound Hammer: Guitar Styles of Western Kentucky, produced on-location in Muhlenberg County, Kentucky, introducing several significant guitarists in this genre to new audiences. Kirtley also participated in four more CD projects for Narada Records, two CD collections on Rounder Records, and has released two books of transcriptions of his music for Mel Bay Publications.

Currently Kirtley tours in the USA and internationally, for concerts, guitar workshops and music camps, producing videos and keeping several recording projects running. He co-authored a book about home recording and writes articles for guitar magazines about guitar technique, recording and other related topics, in magazines such as Electronic Musician, Acoustic Guitar, Onstage, Home Recording, and Wood & Steel, as well as in the German magazine Akustik Gitarre.,

From 1996 to 2009, he represented Taylor Guitars in workshops and guitar clinics at dealers throughout the US and internationally. In 2006, Kirtley was honored as the newest inductee to the National Thumbpicker's Hall of Fame.

Pat Kirtley lives in Nelson County, Kentucky.

Influences and technique 

Kirtley's musical influences are quite diverse. He names among others Chet Atkins, Jerry Reed, Lenny Breau, Merle Travis, Mose Rager, Les Paul, Doc Watson, Antonín Dvořák, Johann Sebastian Bach, Edgar Varèse, Antonio Carlos Jobim, Luis Bonfa, John Cage, Harry Partch, Wendy Carlos, Jimi Hendrix, Bernard Herrmann, Dave Brubeck, Frank Zappa, David Crosby, Wes Montgomery and Keith Jarrett.

In the early years of his career he drew from country and bluegrass sources, but at the close of the '80s he began to explore Irish – Celtic music, using alternate tunings like DADGAD in guitar arrangements of Irish fiddle and airs. Later he ventured to Brazilian and South American music, adding to a repertoire not easily categorized. His compositions are a blend of folk, pop, and other traditions.

Coming from Kentucky, his "finger-" or "thumbpicker"-roots are close to the playing of Chet Atkins, Merle Travis and Doc Watson. Kirtley uses his thumb for a regular and driving alternate bass while playing the melody with the other fingers. This melody is often syncopated and creates a swinging tension in conjunction with the regular alternate bass. Additionally he uses the frailing-technique like a banjo player by lightly brushing several or all strings, alternating down- and upstrokes with bass notes. His bass-lines are meticulously composed and often repeatedly take over parts of the melody. In several of his pieces he uses single note runs build from open and fretted strings creating a very particular sound, mostly in intro- and outro-parts and bridges leading from one part of the piece to the next. Kirtley mainly composes short and clearly structured pieces, containing three choruses, with variations in the second and third chorus and an ending repeating the main melody.

Guitars and technical equipment 
On his CDs and in concerts Pat Kirtley uses the following guitars,:

 Martin MC-28
 Martin 00-17 (1952)
 Taylor NS42 Nylon
 Taylor 512-CE
 Taylor 514-C
 Kirk Sand electroacoustic
 Godin Multiac MIDI guitar

His favored Taylor has an EMG magnetic soundhole- pickup with Fishman pickups in other guitars. On stage he mixes the pickup-signal with the input of a good condenser microphone.

In the recording studio he records with microphones and additional effects. Along with the Godin Multiac MIDI guitar he uses a Roland GR-series synthesizer, Lexicon Jamman, and Lexicon and Alesis reverbs.

Kirtley uses a Fred Kelly thumbpick and plays with plastic-reinforced nails. He prefers .012 to .054"-gauge Elixir Phosphor Bronze Light strings.

Discography 
Compiled mainly from discography at Funky Music

 1994 Kentucky Guitar (Mainstring Music)
 1997 Irish Guitar (Mainstring Music)
 1998 Rural Life (Mainstring Music)
 2000 Just Listen (Mainstring Music)
 2002 Brazilian Guitar (Mainstring Music)
 2011 December Smiles (Mainstring Music)

Collaborations, guest musician 

 1999 Before My Time, Todd Hallawell (Soundset)
 2001 Wanted! Jesse James Alias: Steve Rector, Steve Rector (Hound Sound Music)
 2004 Exotic America, Andy Robinson (Brontosaurus Records)
 2005 Contrast, with Pauly Zarb (Pauly Zarb and Pat Kirtley)

Compilations 

 1996 Guitar Fingerstyle: A Narada Collection (Narada)
 1997 Dance of the Celts: A Narada Collection (Narada)
 1997 Masters of Acoustic Guitar (Narada)
 1998 Celtic Fingerstyle Guitar V. 1: The Blarney Pilgrim (Rounder Records ROUN3157)
 1998 Celtic Fingerstyle Guitar V. 2: Ramble to Cashel (Rounder Records ROUN3156)
 1998 Acoustic Guitar Highlights, Vol. 2 (Solid Air)
 2001 Guitar Fingerstyle 2: A Narada Collection (Narada)

Video, DVD 

 1998 The Blarney Pilgrim (vestapol 13063dvd)
 1998 Ramble to Cashel (vestapol 13029dvd)
 2004 Nine Pound Hammer: Guitar Styles of Western Kentucky (vestapol 13081dvd)
 2004 Introduction to Thumbstyle Guitar (Mel Bay Productions GW301DVD)
 2005 Introduction To Alternate Tunings (Mel Bay Productions GW302DVD)
 2005 Introduction To Celtic Fingerstyle Guitar (Mel Bay Productions GW303DVD)
 2008 Pickin' Like Chet Vol 1 Guitar (Stefan Grossman's Workshop GW985/6)2-DVD set
 2008 Pickin' Like Chet Vol 2 Guitar (Stefan Grossman's Workshop GW987/8)2-DVD set

Sheet music, books 

 1999 Acoustic Guitar Artist Songbook, Vol. 1. String Letter Publishing, 
 2000 Kentucky Guitar. Mel Bay Productions 97331D, 
 2000 Master Anthology of Fingerstyle Guitar Solos Vol.1. Mel Bay Productions 98370BCD, 
 2003 Irish Guitar: Celtic Guitar Solos. Mel Bay Productions 97332, 
 2006 Home Recording Studio Basics. Mike Levine, David Darlington, Pat Kirtley, Rusty Cutchin (Cherry Lane Music).

References

External links 
 Pat Kirtley at MySpace

American acoustic guitarists
American male guitarists
Fingerstyle guitarists
1952 births
American audio engineers
Living people
20th-century American guitarists
20th-century American male musicians